The Flaming Forest is a 1926 American silent drama film directed by Reginald Barker and starring Antonio Moreno and Renée Adorée. The film is based on the novel of the same name by James Oliver Curwood, and was produced by Cosmopolitan Productions and distributed by Metro-Goldwyn-Mayer.  A two-color Technicolor sequence was shot for a climactic blaze sequence featured in the film.

This is a preserved film at the Library of Congress.

Plot
North-West Mounted Police sergeant David Carrigan (Antonio Moreno) fights Indians and woos Jeanne-Marie (Renée Adorée).

Cast
 Antonio Moreno as Sergeant David Carrigan 
 Renée Adorée as Jeanne-Marie 
 Gardner James as Roger Audemard 
 William Austin as Alfred Wimbledon 
 Tom O'Brien as Mike 
 Emile Chautard as André Audemard 
 Oscar Beregi, Sr. as Jules Lagarre 
 Clarence Geldart as Major Charles McVane 
 Frank Leigh as Lupin 
 Charles Ogle as Donald McTavish 
 Roy Coulson as François 
 D'Arcy McCoy as Bobbie 
 Claire McDowell as Mrs. McTavish 
 Bert Roach as Sloppy 
 Mary Jane Irving as Ruth McTavish

See also
List of early color feature films

References

External links

The Flaming Forest at SilentEra
 

1926 films
1926 drama films
1920s color films
Silent American drama films
American silent feature films
American black-and-white films
Films based on American novels
Metro-Goldwyn-Mayer films
Silent films in color
Northern (genre) films
Royal Canadian Mounted Police in fiction
Early color films
Films based on novels by James Oliver Curwood
Films directed by Reginald Barker
1920s American films